Barracuda Networks, Inc. is a company providing security, networking and storage products based on network appliances and cloud services. The company's security products include products for protection against email, web surfing, web hackers and instant messaging threats such as spam, spyware, trojans, and viruses. The company's networking and storage products include web filtering, load balancing, application delivery controllers, message archiving, NG firewalls, backup services and data protection.

History
Barracuda Networks was founded in 2003 by Dean Drako (founding CEO), Michael Perone, and Zach Levow; the company introduced the Barracuda Spam and Virus Firewall in the same year. In 2007 the company moved its headquarters to Campbell, California, and opened an office in Ann Arbor, Michigan.

In January 2006, it closed its first outside investment of $40 million from Sequoia Capital and Francisco Partners.

On January 29, 2008, Barracuda Networks was sued by Trend Micro over their use of the open source anti-virus software Clam AntiVirus, which Trend Micro claimed to be in violation of their patent on 'anti-virus detection on an SMTP or FTP gateway'. In addition to providing samples of prior art in an effort to render Trend Micro's patent invalid, in July 2008 Barracuda launched a countersuit against Trend Micro claiming Trend Micro violated several antivirus patents Barracuda Networks had acquired from IBM.

In December 2008, the company launched the BRBL (Barracuda Reputation Block List), its proprietary and dynamic list of known spam servers, for free and public use in blocking spam at the gateway.
Soon after opening BRBL many IP addresses got blacklisted without apparent reason and without any technical explanation.

As of October 2009, Barracuda had over 85,000 customers. As of November, 2011, Barracuda had more than 130,000 customers.  As of January, 2014, Barracuda has more than 150,000 customers worldwide.

In 2012, the company became a co-sponsor of the Garmin-Barracuda UCI ProTour cycling team and entitlement sponsor of the 2011 Indianapolis 500 champion Bryan Herta Autosport in the IndyCar Series, with the #98 Lotus driven by Alex Tagliani, who will defend the team's championship.

Barracuda Networks expanded its research and development facility in Ann Arbor to a 12,500 square foot office building on Depot Street in 2008.  By 2012, the Michigan-based research division had grown to about 180 employees, again outgrowing its space.  In June, 2012, Barracuda signed a lease to occupy the 45,000 square foot office complex previously used as the Borders headquarters on Maynard St in downtown Ann Arbor.

In July 2012, Dean Drako, Barracuda Networks's co-founder, president and CEO since it was founded in 2003, resigned his operating position, remaining on the company's board of directors.  At the time of Drako's departure, the company stated it had achieved profitability, a nearly ongoing 30 annual percent growth rate since inception, 150,000 customers worldwide, nearly 1,000 employees, 10 offices, and did business in 80 countries. The company created the office of the CEO as it started a CEO search.

In November 2012, long-time EMC executive William "BJ" Jenkins joined the company as president and CEO. Jenkins worked at EMC since 1998 and most recently served as president of EMC's Backup and Recovery Systems (BRS) Division.

In November 2013, Barracuda Networks went public on the New York Stock Exchange under the ticker symbol CUDA.

In March 2015, Barracuda Networks expanded its business to North Asia and was distributed by TriTech Distribution Limited in Hong Kong.

In November 2015, Barracuda added new Next Generation Firewall to its firewall family.

Barracuda has announced future discontinuation of its Copy and CudaDrive services as of May 2016.

In November 2017, private equity firm Thoma Bravo announced they were taking Barracuda Networks private in a $1.6 billion buyout. In February 2018 Thoma Bravo announced that it has completed the acquisition.
	
In April 2022, KKR announced the signing of an agreement to purchase Barracuda Networks from Thoma Bravo for about $4 billion, which completed in August that year.

Products

In chronological order:
 Email Security Gateway - In October 2003, Barracuda announced its spam and virus firewall plug-in appliance. In June 2008, Barracuda launched a spam and virus firewall for large enterprises and ISPs.
 Web Security Gateway - In April 2005, the company introduced its web filtering appliance to prevent spyware and viruses from gathering and transmitting user data, and to control web surfing.
 Load balancer ADC - In November 2006, the company introduced a load balancing appliance for high availability distribution of network traffic across multiple servers.
 Message Archiver - In July 2007, the company introduced message archiving to index and preserve emails, and to meet legal and regulatory compliance.
 SSL VPN & Remote Access - In November 2008, the company launched its secure sockets layer virtual private network product to provide secure, clientless, remote access.
 Web Application Firewall - Announced in February 2008, for securing Web applications for large enterprises and to address regulation compliance such as PCI DSS.
 Link Balancer - Announced in September 2008, to optimize and aggregate internet connections from different providers, is currently End Of Life.

 Barracuda Backup - In November 2008, the company announced a service to back up data in the cloud, including on-site backup with data deduplication and off-site data replication for disaster recovery. In January 2009, Barracuda added message-level backup for Microsoft Exchange and Novell GroupWise, integrating Barracuda Backup Service with Yosemite Backup, formerly Tapeware.
 Web Security Service - In October 2009, in conjunction with its acquisition of Purewire, Barracuda Networks launched the Purewire Web Security Service which is a software as a service offering for Web filtering, content security, and safe web surfing.
 NextGen Firewall - In February 2010, Barracuda announced its NextGen Firewalls to protect enterprise network infrastructures. The firewalls integrate web and email filtering, intrusion prevention, layer 7 application profiling, and network access control into one platform that is centrally managed across multiple distributed enterprise network locations. NextGen Firewalls are available as a hardware appliance, virtual appliance and public cloud instance.  The product includes wide area network traffic optimization.
 CudaTel Communication Server (PBX) - in August 2010, Barracuda announced the release of CudaTel, a VOIP Private branch exchange designed for IT administrators. CudaTel features FreeSWITCH, an open-source project sponsored by Barracuda Networks.
 Copy.com was announced as a cloud storage service in February 2013. The service was discontinued on May 1, 2016.
 Barracuda Sentinel - In June 2017, Barracuda launched an artificial intelligence service to prevent spear phishing and cyber fraud.
 Barracuda Mobile Device Manager end-of-life was announced in December 2017.  The free service was launched in 2014.

Acquisitions
In September 2007, Barracuda Networks acquired NetContinuum, a company providing application controllers  to secure and manage enterprise web applications.

In November 2008, Barracuda Networks expanded into cloud-based backup services by acquiring BitLeap.

In November 2008, Barracuda Networks acquired 3SP, allowing the company to introduce Secure Sockets Layer (SSL) Virtual Private Network (VPN) products to allow secure remote access to network file shares, internal Web sites and remote control capabilities for desktops and servers.

In January 2009, Barracuda Networks acquired Yosemite Technologies to add software agents for incremental backups of applications such as Microsoft Exchange Server and SQL Server, and Windows system states.

September 2009, Barracuda Networks acquired controlling interest in phion AG, an Austria-based public company  delivering enterprise-class firewalls.

In October 2009, Barracuda Networks acquired Purewire Inc, a software as a service (SaaS) company offering cloud based web filtering and security.

In April 2013, Barracuda Networks acquired SignNow.

In 2014, Barracuda Networks purchased C2C Systems UK.

In October 2015, Barracuda Networks acquired Intronis.

In November 2017, Barracuda purchased Sonian

In November 2017, Barracuda announced that it was being acquired by private equity investment firm Thoma Bravo, LLC.

In January 2018, Barracuda acquired PhishLine.

Controversies

Security Issue 
In January 2013, a backdoor was discovered: "A variety of firewall, VPN, and spam filtering gear sold by Barracuda Networks contains undocumented backdoor accounts that allow people to remotely log in and access sensitive information, researchers with an Austrian security firm have warned." The backdoor was then secured shortly after the announcement.

IP reputation and Emailreg.org 
On April 13, 2009, Emailreg.org published a notice clarifying that it is a whitelist of domains that had no impact on Barracuda Blog Lists.  April 10, 2010 a blog entry appeared alleging that Barracuda Networks SPAM blocking deliberately targets non-spamming IP addresses and tries to get them to sign up for an email whitelisting service "emailreg.org".  In 2019 Emailreg.org announced that it was no longer accepting new customers but would continue services for existing customers until further notice.  Emailreg.org discontinued services shortly thereafter and is no longer in operation. As of May 2, 2020 the same warning appears for some IP addresses.

See also
 Comparison of file hosting services
 Comparison of file synchronization software
 Comparison of online backup services

References

External links
 

American companies established in 2003
Companies based in Campbell, California
Networking companies of the United States
Networking hardware companies
Networking software companies
Computer security software companies
Telecommunications equipment vendors
Service-oriented (business computing)
Computer security companies
Firewall software
Spam filtering
Anti-spam
Email
Content-control software
Backup software
Deep packet inspection
Companies formerly listed on the New York Stock Exchange
One-click hosting
Private equity portfolio companies
Kohlberg Kravis Roberts companies
Software companies established in 2003
2003 establishments in California
2013 initial public offerings
2018 mergers and acquisitions
2022 mergers and acquisitions